Krida Bakti Stadium is a multi-use stadium in Purwodadi, Indonesia.  It is currently used mostly for football matches.  The stadium holds 12,000 people.

References

Multi-purpose stadiums in Indonesia

Football venues in Indonesia
Buildings and structures in Central Java